Groupe ISAE is a network of aeronautical engineering Colleges in France.

History 
The group has been founded in May 2011 by the Institut supérieur de l'aéronautique et de l'espace (now called ISAE-SUPAERO) in Toulouse and the École nationale supérieure de mécanique et d'aérotechnique (ENSMA), which then took the name of ISAE-ENSMA.

In September 2012, the ISAE Group expanded by integrating the École supérieure des techniques aéronautiques et de construction automobile (ESTACA) located in Saint-Quentin-en-Yvelines and in Laval, and the École de l'air et de l'Espace located in Salon-de-Provence.

In January 2018, the ISAE Group has been enriched by the addition of a fifth College: the Institut supérieur de mécanique de Paris, now called ISAE-SUPMECA.

On the 1st of February 2022, the École nationale de l'aviation civile, the biggest European aviation University, joined the group.

Purpose and aims 
The Groupe ISAE is established in the form of a consortium of cooperation between autonomous institutions. It is governed by a partnership agreement which includes a common charter.

Its purpose is « to federate Colleges in France in the field of aeronautical and space engineering under a common banner, so as to increase the influence of these Colleges, both nationally and internationally, and to promote the training of engineers in the fields of aeronautics and aerospace ».

The projects and actions carried out jointly by the members of the Groupe ISAE concern training, research and national and international influence.

The projects and actions of the Groupe ISAE are developed with the support of the GIFAS (Groupement des industries françaises aéronautiques et spatiales), whose member companies represent the main employers of graduates from the group's Colleges.

References

External links 
 Official website

Aviation schools
Aerospace engineering organizations
Aviation schools in France
Grandes écoles
Organizations established in 2011
École nationale de l'aviation civile